Caprice Ka'anohikula Dydasco (born August 19, 1993) is an American soccer defender who plays as an right back for the Houston Dash in the National Women's Soccer League. She previously played for Pali Blues, the Washington Spirit, and Newcastle Jets. She played college soccer with the UCLA Bruins.

Early life
The daughter of Jose and Misty Dydasco, Dydasco played soccer for Kamehameha Schools in Honolulu and the Honolulu Bulls Soccer Club.  She was a youth All-American in 2009 and 2010.  Her brother, Zane Dydasco, played soccer for the United States Air Force Academy. Her sister True currently plays for the University of Oregon. Dydasco began playing for U.S. national soccer teams at the age of 14.  She was a starter on the United States women's national under-17 soccer team in 2009, but was injured and unable to compete in the 2010 FIFA U-17 Women's World Cup.

Playing career

College
Dydasco was a four-year starter as a defender for the UCLA Bruins from 2011 to 2014.  She appeared in 94 games and scored five goals and had 23 assists. As a junior she helped UCLA to win their first NCAA Championship.

Club

Pali Blues, 2013–2014
Dydasco played for the semi-professional Pali Blues in 2013 and 2014. In March 2014, playing in the midfield for the United States women's national under-23 soccer team, she assisted on the game-winning goal to win the Six Nations Tournament in Spain. In March 2015 Dydasco started all three of the matches of the United States under-23 team at a tournament in La Manga Club, Spain.

Washington Spirit, 2015–2019
On January 16, 2015, Dydasco was drafted to play for the Washington Spirit in the National Women's Soccer League. She was the nineteenth player picked in the draft.  She is "known for speed" and was described by Spirit coach Mark Parsons as "the most attacking defender out there."  She played in six matches for the Spirit in 2015.

In 2016, Dydasco started in 12 regular season and both post season matches for the Spirit. In the NWSL championship on October 9, Dydasco suffered a torn ACL (Anterior cruciate ligament injury) and was unable to join the Newcastle Jets for the 2016–2017 season.

Dydasco signed a new contract with the Spirit on June 14, 2017. After missing the first part of the 2017 season as she was still recovering from injury, Dydasco make her return to the field on June 24 against the Portland Thorns.

Loan to Newcastle Jets
On October 8, 2015, Dydasco joined Australian W-League club Newcastle Jets on loan for the 2015–16 season.

NJ/NY Gotham, 2019–2022
In January 2019, Dydasco was traded to Sky Blue FC along with teammates DiDi Haracic and Estelle Johnson for the third overall and 29th picks of the 2019 NWSL College Draft.

On October 6, 2021, Dydasco made her 100th regular-season appearance in the NWSL.

Following five appearances on the NWSL Team of the Month lists during the 2021 season, Dydasco was named as the NWSL Defender of the Year on November 15, 2021. She was also named to the NWSL Best XI alongside teammates Kailen Sheridan and Margaret Purce as part of the 2021 NWSL awards. She appeared in every match for Gotham FC, playing over 2000 minutes, notching five assists, and scoring her first career goal.

Dydasco signed a new two-year contract with Gotham FC prior to the start of the 2022 season.

Houston Dash, 2022–present
On August 19, 2022, Gotham FC traded Dydasco to the Houston Dash in exchange for $120,000 in allocation money, and an additional $10,000 for every postseason match she plays for the Dash, up to a total of $150,000.

References

External links
 Washington Spirit player profile
 US Soccer player profile
 UCLA Bruins player profile
 
 Gotham FC player profile 

1993 births
Living people
American women's soccer players
American expatriate sportspeople in Australia
Expatriate women's soccer players in Australia
Kamehameha Schools alumni
National Women's Soccer League players
Newcastle Jets FC (A-League Women) players
Pali Blues players
Soccer players from Honolulu
UCLA Bruins women's soccer players
Washington Spirit draft picks
Washington Spirit players
Women's association football defenders
NJ/NY Gotham FC players
Houston Dash players